Martha Karagianni (6 November 1939 – 18 September 2022) was a Greek film actress. She was born in Athens, but raised in Keratsini. She was one of the most popular Greek actresses of the 1960s. She starred in many films, 19 of which were produced by Finos Film. She had a relationship with Dimitrios Stefanakos, and she was married to Vasilis Konstantinou for many years.

Films
Madame X (1956) ..... Eleni
Liar Wanted (1961) ..... Pitsa-Kitsa
Exo oi kleftes (1961) ..... Margarita
Merikoi to protimoun kryo (1963) ..... Lela
Something Is Burning (1964) ..... Rena
Kiss the Girls (1965) ..... Martha
Oi Thalassies oi Hadres (1967) ..... Eleni
Gorgones ke Manges (1968) ..... Marina
Marijuana Stop! (1971) ..... Despoina
Pethaino gia sena (2009) ..... grandmother

External links

References

1939 births
2022 deaths
Greek film actresses
Greek television actresses
Greek stage actresses
Actresses from Athens
Actors from Piraeus
Pontic Greeks
20th-century Greek actresses
21st-century Greek actresses